Eva de la Caridad Méndez (born March 5, 1974), known professionally as Eva Mendes, is an American actress, model and fashion designer. Her acting career began in the late 1990s, with a series of roles in films such as Children of the Corn V: Fields of Terror (1998) and Urban Legends: Final Cut (2000).

Mendes's performance in Training Day (2001) marked a turning point in her career and led to parts in the commercially successful films 2 Fast 2 Furious (2003) and Hitch (2005). She starred in Ghost Rider (2007) and The Spirit (2008), both film adaptations of comics, and ventured into more dramatic territory with We Own the Night (2007), Bad Lieutenant: Port of Call New Orleans (2009), Last Night (2010), and The Place Beyond the Pines (2012). Her other films include Out of Time (2003), The Women (2008), The Other Guys (2010), and Girl in Progress (2012).

Mendes has appeared in several music videos for artists like Will Smith, and has also been an ambassador for brands, including Calvin Klein, Cartier, Reebok, Pantene shampoo, Morgan and Peek & Cloppenburg. She has designed for New York & Company and is the creative director of CIRCA Beauty, a makeup line sold at Walgreens. She has been in a relationship with Canadian actor Ryan Gosling since 2011, and they have two daughters.

Early life
Mendes was born on March 5, 1974, in Miami, Florida, to Cuban parents Eva Pérez Suárez and Juan Carlos Méndez, and was raised by her mother in the Los Angeles neighborhood of Silver Lake, after her parents' divorce. Her mother worked at Mann's Chinese Theatre and later for an aerospace company, and her father ran a meat distribution business. Mendes had one older brother, Juan Carlos Méndez Jr. (1963–2016), who died from throat cancer. She also has an older sister, Janet, and a younger paternal half-brother, Carlos Alberto "Carlo" Méndez. She attended Hoover High School in Glendale, and later studied marketing at California State University, Northridge, but left college to pursue acting under Ivana Chubbuck.

Acting career

Beginnings and breakthrough (1998–2001)
Mendes began her acting career after a talent manager saw her photo in a friend's portfolio. Her first film role was that of one in a group of young people who become lost in middle America in the direct-to-video horror film Children of the Corn V: Fields of Terror. Mendes was disappointed in her performance and soon hired an acting coach. She subsequently took on the roles of a bridesmaid in the comedy A Night at the Roxbury (1998), with Will Ferrell and Chris Kattan, a housekeeper in the fantasy family film My Brother the Pig (1999), with Scarlett Johansson, and that of an ill-fated film student in the slasher film Urban Legends: Final Cut (2000).

Mendes appeared in the Steven Seagal action thriller Exit Wounds (2001), which made over US$73 million worldwide. According to Mendes, her voice was dubbed in the editing, with a producer telling her that she "didn’t sound intelligent enough". Her breakthrough came later in 2001 with her performance as the mistress of a corrupt cop in Antoine Fuqua's crime thriller Training Day, alongside Denzel Washington and Ethan Hawke. She described her role as "pivotal" in her career, stating that it motivated her to keep going as an actress, as she was "bored"  doing "terrible cheesy horrible" films before she obtained it. Training Day was a box office hit, grossing US$104.5 million.

Worldwide exposure (2002–2009)

Her role in Training Day led to larger film parts and Mendes soon established herself as a Hollywood actress. While her sole film release in 2002 was the crime comedy All About the Benjamins, in which she played the girlfriend of a con artist, Mendes had roles on four studio feature films released throughout 2003. 2 Fast 2 Furious teamed her with Paul Walker and Tyrese Gibson, portraying a United States Customs Service agent working undercover for a notorious Argentine drug lord. The film gave Mendes a much wider exposure, grossing over US$236 million globally. The Western action film Once Upon a Time in Mexico saw her star with Antonio Banderas and Salma Hayek, as the daughter of a Mexican drug lord. While reviews for the film were mixed, it made US$98.1 million.

Mendes reunited with Denzel Washington for the thriller Out of Time, in which she played the soon-to-be ex-wife of a well-respected chief of police. The film was a moderate commercial success, and Roger Ebert, in his review for the film, described Mendes' role as a "curiously forgiving character, who feels little rancor for the straying [husband] and apparently still likes him; maybe there would have been more suspense if she were furious with him". Her last 2003 film was the comedy Stuck on You, with Matt Damon and Greg Kinnear, in which she played an aspiring actress.

She starred as the love interest of a professional dating consultant (Will Smith), in her next film, Hitch (2005), which made her one of the first minority actors to play the lead in a mainstream romantic comedy. USA Today described it as "her best screen role to date," and Detroit Free Press remarked: "Smith and Mendes are terrific together. He brings her game up so high you'd think she has had as many good parts as Smith." Hitch made US$368.1 million in its global theatrical run. In 2005, Mendes also starred in the little-seen films The Wendell Baker Story and Guilty Hearts.

In the romantic comedy Trust the Man (2006), Mendes starred with David Duchovny, Billy Crudup, Julianne Moore, and Maggie Gyllenhaal, playing what The A.V. Club described as a "vapid sexpot". The much criticized Ghost Rider (2007), based on the Marvel Comics character, featured Mendes as the love interest of the titular character (Nicolas Cage). The film fared well commercially, opening atop at the North American box office, with earnings of more than US$45 million; it eventually made over US$228 million worldwide. She starred opposite Joaquin Phoenix and Mark Wahlberg in the thriller We Own the Night (also 2007), as the girlfriend of an NYPD captain's brother. Critic Peter Travers found the film to be "defiantly, refreshingly unhip" and noted that "sizzle comes naturally" from Mendes. In 2007, she also starred in the films Live! and Cleaner, both of which went unnoticed by audiences, and made an uncredited cameo appearance in the comedy Knocked Up.

In 2008, Mendes took on the role of a perfume salesgirl in Saks Fifth Avenue in the all-female comedy The Women, opposite Meg Ryan, Annette Bening, Debra Messing, and Jada Pinkett Smith. Though a commercial success, The Women was panned by critics, with Mendes earning a  nomination for the Golden Raspberry Award for Worst Actress for her performance. She also played the femme fatale  Sand Saref in 2008's The Spirit, based on the newspaper comic strip of the same name by Will Eisner. It received lackluster reviews from critics, who deemed it melodramatic, unoriginal, and sexist. Her only 2009 film release was the crime drama Bad Lieutenant: Port of Call New Orleans, which reunited her with Nicolas Cage, playing a prostitute, and again, his love interest. While the film found a limited audience in theaters, it garnered acclaim, appearing on many top ten lists of the year.

Further roles (2010-present)

Mendes reunited with previous collaborators Will Ferrell and Mark Wahlberg for the action comedy The Other Guys (2010), in which she portrayed the wife of a mild-mannered forensic NYPD accountant (Ferrell). It was a commercial success, grossing US$170.4 million globally. In 2010, she also played the co-worker and the love interest of a committed man in Massy Tadjedin's  romantic drama Last Night, alongside Keira Knightley and Sam Worthington. While she was initially reluctant to star, worrying that the character would "lack originality" and was "too seductive", she agreed to play the role after meeting with Tadjedin; she said: "It was great to connect with a female director and talk about this woman and not objectify her as the other woman but give her a real true life and make her honest ... Thank God I did."

In 2011, Mendes appeared in an uncredited cameo in Fast Five, reprising her role from 2 Fast 2 Furious. In 2012, she starred in the dramedy Girl in Progress, as a single mom raising her fourteen-year-old daughter, and in the art fantasy drama Holy Motors, as Kay M, a role originally written for Kate Moss. While Girl in Progress earned Mendes an ALMA Award nomination for Favorite Movie Actress, she described Holy Motors as "the coolest, most creative thing I've ever done".  

In The Place Beyond the Pines (also 2012), a drama directed by Derek Cianfrance and alongside Ryan Gosling and Bradley Cooper, Mendes portrayed the former lover of a motorcycle stuntman. The film was a moderate commercial success, and Entertainment Weekly, in its review, described her performance as "quietly heartbreaking".  She also visited Sierra Leone and was featured in the PBS documentary Half the Sky: Turning Oppression into Opportunity for Women Worldwide, which aired in October 2012.

In 2013, Mendes appeared in the HBO comedy film Clear History, as a formerly heavy-set woman, and in 2014, she starred as a cabaret show performer in Ryan Gosling's directorial debut Lost River, which competed in the Un Certain Regard section at the Cannes Film Festival. This would be her last acting role until 2021, when she voiced a character in the animated series Bluey in the episode “Born Yesterday”.

Other endeavors

Modeling
Mendes appeared in the Pet Shop Boys' music video for "Se a vida é (That's the Way Life Is)" in 1996, Aerosmith's music video for "Hole in My Soul" in 1997, and Will Smith's music video for "Miami" in 1998. She also appeared in the music video for The Strokes' "The End Has No End" in 2004.

In 2005, Mendes was employed by Revlon as an international spokesperson, and participated in their campaign to raise funds for breast cancer research. In December 2007, People for the Ethical Treatment of Animals (PETA) used a nude photo of Mendes for their anti-fur campaign. Mendes was a spokesmodel for the 2008 Campari calendar. She also appeared nude in a 2008 print advertisement for Calvin Klein's Secret Obsession perfume, an ad that United States network executives found too risqué for broadcasting.

Mendes has been a spokesperson for Calvin Klein, Magnum, and the chocolate milk brand Cocio. She also promoted Thierry Mugler's Angel fragrance, Reebok shoes, and Pantene shampoo. In 2011, Mendes appeared in a Peek & Cloppenburg clothing catalog.

Fashion designing
Mendes has a line of bed linens and dinnerware that is sold at Macy's. In February 2013, she partnered with New York & Co. to launch her  own fashion line, Eva by Eva Mendes. She is also the creative director of the makeup brand CIRCA Beauty, which launched exclusively at Walgreens in 2015.

Singing
In 2010, Mendes sang "Pimps Don't Cry," a song featured in The Other Guys, and also performed a duet with CeeLo Green with the same song. In 2011, she recorded a version of "The Windmills of Your Mind". She also featured in the single "Miami" sung by Will Smith which was released in 1998.

Public image

Many media outlets have cited her as one of the world's most beautiful Latin women, and she has been often considered a sex symbol. She once embraced that status, saying it was "partially self-created ... I think at times I play up my sexiness. And there's times where I don't", though she does not let it interfere with her film work: "I like it when it doesn't limit my career. It's a part of my life, but on a secondary plane". Nevertheless, her professional trajectory throughout the 2000s tended to gravitate towards parts that relied heavily on her looks.  She has not appeared in a film since 2014.

Mendes ranked 54th, 12th, 7th, 7th, and 11th in Maxim magazine's Hot 100 issue in 2002, 2005, 2007, 2008, and 2010 respectively, and appeared several times on the cover. She also ranked 80th, 23rd and 44th in FHM magazine's "100 Sexiest Women in the World" supplement in 2004, 2005, 2006.  She was voted number four in the 2008 edition, and number one in the 2009 edition, of AskMen.com's Top 99 Most Desirable Women. People also named her one of 2011's Most Beautiful at Every Age.

Personal life
Mendes was in a relationship with filmmaker George Augusto from 2002 to 2010.

In September 2011 she began dating Ryan Gosling, shortly after they filmed The Place Beyond the Pines together. They have two daughters born in 2014 and 2016.

Mendes is a pescatarian for both ethical and health reasons. She also practices Transcendental Meditation.

Filmography

Film

Television

Music videos

Awards and nominations

References

External links

1974 births
20th-century American actresses
21st-century American actresses
Actresses from Glendale, California
Actresses from Los Angeles
Actresses from Miami
American entertainers of Cuban descent
American film actresses
American stage actresses
American television actresses
California people in fashion
Female models
Hispanic and Latino American actresses
Living people